Grevillea phylicoides, commonly known as grey spider flower is a species of flowering plant in the family Proteaceae and is endemic to eastern New South Wales. It is a shrub with more or less elliptic to oblong or lance-shaped leaves and woolly-hairy grey flowers.

Description

Grey spider flower is similar to G. buxifolia but has narrower leaves and smaller groups of flowers.

Taxonomy
Grevillea phylicoides was first formally described in 1810 by Robert Brown in Transactions of the Linnean Society of London. The specific epithet (phylicoides) means "Phylica-like".

Distribution and habitat
Grey spider flower grows in woodland and heath between Wisemans Ferry, the Colo Wilderness, the Burragorang Valley and Wentworth Falls in eastern New South Wales.

References

phylicoides
Flora of New South Wales
Proteales of Australia
Plants described in 1810
Taxa named by Robert Brown (botanist, born 1773)